Peter Lund (born 30 December 1965, in Flensburg) is a German theatre director, playwright, and author, as well as Professor for Acting at Berlin University of the Arts. He has pioneered the New German Musical at the Neuköllner Oper in Berlin.

Life & Career 
Lund was educated in Flensburg and in Berlin, where he studied architecture. Since 1985 he has been active as a theatre director and author, e.g., in Braunschweig, Hannover, Darmstadt, Bremen, Hamburg, Basel, Innsbruck and Vienna. His focus lies on opera, operetta, and musical theatre. In 1985 he founded the performance ensemble Gruppe Comp&Co. From 1996 to 2004 he was artistic director of the Neuköllner Oper in Berlin. Since 2002, Lund is Professor for Acting at the Musical/Show department at Berlin University of the Arts.

Lund initiated a collaboration of the Berlin University of the Arts Musical/Show department with the Neuköllner Oper in Berlin. The university's graduating class performs a professional production of a new musical penned by Lund in collaboration with composers Thomas Zaufke and Wolfgang Böhmer, among others.

In 2019, Lund and Zaufke produced a feature film version of KOPFKINO, which premiered at Cinema Diverse: The Palm Springs LGBTQ Film Festival in 2019. It was since screened at the Boddinale in Berlin and the Festival Audiovisual Infantil in Mérida, Venezuela.

List of Selected Works 

 Hexen (1991), Music: Danny Ashkenasi
 Zarah 47 (1992) Music: diverse
 No Sex (1993), Music: Niclas Ramdohr
 Hexe Hillary geht in die Oper (1997)
 Das Wunder von Neukölln ("The Miracle of Neukölln", 1998), Music: Wolfgang Böhmer
 SommerNachtTraum (2000), Music: Wolfgang Böhmer
 Baby Talk (2000), Music: Thomas Zaufke
 Cinderella passt was nicht (2000), Music: Thomas Zaufke
 Love Bite (2001), Music: Wolfgang Böhmer
 Elternabend (2003), Music: Thomas Zaufke
 Letterland aka „Erwin Kannes – Trost der Frauen“ (2005), Music: Thomas Zaufke
 Held Müller (2006), Music: Thomas Zaufke
 Maja & Co (2006), Music: Jaques Offenbach, Wolfgang Böhmer
Ugly Ducklings (2007), Music: Thomas Zaufke
 Kauf Dir ein Kind (2007), Music: Thomas Zaufke
Leben ohne Chris ("Life without Chris", 2009), Music: Wolfgang Böhmer
Mein Avatar und ich ("My avatar and I", 2010), Music: Thomas Zaufke
Big Money (2011), Music: Thomas Zaufke
Frau Zucker will die Weltherrschaft (2011), Music: Wolfgang Böhmer
 Stimmen im Kopf (2013), Music: Wolfgang Böhmer
Die letzte Kommune ("The Last Commune", 2013), Music: Thomas Zaufke
Schwestern im Geiste ("Sisters in Mind", 2014), Music: Thomas Zaufke
Grimm! – Die wirklich wahre Geschichte von Rotkäppchen und ihrem Wolf ("Grimm! – The really true story of Little Red Riding Hood and her wolf", 2014), Music: Thomas Zaufke
Stella (2016), Music: Wolfgang Böhmer
KOPFKINO (2017), Music: Thomas Zaufke
Welcome to Hell (2018), Music: Peter Michael von der Nahmer
Drachenherz (2019), Music: Wolfgang Böhmer

Awards 
In August 2015 Peter Lund was nominated for the German Musical Theatre Award by the German Musical Academy and was honored in the category Best Book for Grimm! on 26 October 2015. In 2016, he was awarded the German Musical Theatre Award for Best Book and Best Lyrics for Stella. In 2019, he won the German Musical Theatre Award for Best Book for Drachenherz.

References

External links 
 http://www.peterlund.de
 www.berlinonline.de – interview of Peter Lund
 Article in the german newspaper „Welt“ about Peter Lund and Thomas Zaufke

1965 births
People from Flensburg
German theatre directors
Living people
German male writers